Highland Plains, Queensland may refer to:

 Highland Plains, Queensland (Maranoa Region), a locality in Maranoa Region, Queensland, Australia
 Highland Plains, Queensland (Toowoomba Region), a locality in Toowoomba Region, Queensland, Australia